Fuat is a masculine Turkish given name and the Turkish spelling of the Arabic name Fuad (Arabic: فؤَاد fū’ād, fou’ād) meaning "heart". 

People named Fuat include:

 Fuat Çapa, Belgian-Turkish football manager
 Fuat Güner, Turkish pop-rock music singer of Mazhar-Fuat-Özkan trio
 Fuat Kalkan, German-Turkish footballer
 Fuat Saka, Turkish singer
 Fuat Sezgin, Turkish writer
 Fuat Uzkınay, Turkish filmmaker
 Fuat Yaman, Turkish football coach
 Mehmet Fuat Köprülü, Ottoman-Turkish politician

See also 
 Fuad

Turkish masculine given names